El Salvador competed at the 2022 World Games held in Birmingham, United States from 7 to 17 July 2022. Two competitors represented the country in the sport of archery.

Competitors
The following is the list of number of competitors in the Games.

Archery

El Salvador competed in archery.

References

Nations at the 2022 World Games
2022
World Games